Tófalu is a village in Heves County, Hungary.

35 Jews lived in the village in 1880 and in 1944 about 20 of them were murdered in the Holocaust of the Jews of Hungary.

In 1950 the village merged with the village of Aldebrő and was called Tódebrő. In 1958 each village returned to its independence.

References

Populated places in Heves County